Jan Miller may refer to:

Jan Miller (actress), British film and TV actress of the 1950s and 1060s
Jan Miller (squash), Australian squash player, won the Australian Open in 1985
Jan D. Miller, American engineer